Mount Goldring is a peak on Pernik Peninsula, Loubet Coast, situated on the north side of Murphy Glacier, to the east of Lallemand Fjord in Graham Land, Antarctica. It was mapped from air photos obtained by the Falkland Islands and Dependencies Aerial Survey Expedition, 1956–57, and was named by the UK Antarctic Place-Names Committee for Denis C. Goldring, a Falkland Islands Dependencies Survey geologist at nearby Detaille Island, 1957–59.

References

 SCAR Composite Gazetteer of Antarctica.

Mountains of Graham Land
Loubet Coast